Neo is an international auxiliary language created by Arturo Alfandari, a Belgian diplomat of Italian descent. It combines features of Esperanto, Ido, Novial, and Volapük. The root base of Neo is closely related to French, with some influence from English.

History
The basic version of Neo was published in 1937 by Arturo Alfandari. It attracted attention in 1961 when Alfandari published his books Cours Pratique de Neo and The Rapid Method of Neo. The works included both brief and complete grammars, learning course of 44 lectures, translations of literary works, scientific and technical texts, idioms, detailed bidirectional French and English dictionaries. The total volume of the publications was 1,304 pages, with dictionaries numbering some 75,000 words.

The language combines the features of Esperanto or Ido, with the same goal: a simple, neutral and easy-to-learn second language for everybody.

Neo attracted the interest of the circle around the International Language Review, a periodical for IAL proponents whose publishers co-founded the international Friends of Neo (Amikos de Neo) with Alfandari; the organization also published its bulletin, the Neo-bulten. For a few years it looked like Neo could give some serious competition to Esperanto and Interlingua.

As Alfandari's health worsened, to avoid disappearance of his language, he founded a second, more serious organization: the Academy of Neo (Akademio de Neo), with the task of regulating, nurturing and spreading the language; but the organization was not very successful. Progress was cut short by Alfandari's death in 1969 and the language was mostly forgotten.

Overview

Grammatically, the language is mostly influenced by Ido and Esperanto; though some characteristics such as a plural -s and natural-appearing pronouns come from naturalistic IALs like Interlingua and Interlingue.

The way of forming the vocabulary and the preference for short, monosyllabic words show a substantial Volapük influence but, unlike the latter's roots which are often changed and mutilated beyond recognition, the Neo roots are easily recognizable as Romance.

It is also notable for its terseness, which exceeds that of English or any International auxiliary language (IAL) of the a priori type, which makes it very compact and brief in expression, and for the facility of its grammar whose overview occupies only two pages.

Phonology

Consonants

Vowels

Orthography

Alphabet

Neo uses the 26 letters of the standard Roman alphabet: 5 vowels and 21 consonants. When spelling a word, the letters have an -e ending:

a, be, ce, de, e, fe, ge, he, i, je, ke, le, me, ne, o, pe, qe, re, se, te, u, ve, we, xe, ye, ze.

Pronunciation

The c has the same pronunciation as the digraph ch; both are pronounced as in English words like chalk or chimney, and in borrowed Italian words like ciao or bocconcini, never with the 'k' sound in care or the 's' sound in certain. The g always has the “hard” pronunciation of get or good, never the “soft” pronunciation of gem or giant. The s is always unvoiced, never pronounced with the 'z' sound in rose or the 'zh' sound in leisure.

Other letters, including the vowels, are pronounced as in Esperanto. Words with the letters q (not pronounced 'kjoo' but as in English 'qu') and x (pronounced 'ks' without an initial vowel) may optionally be spelled with kw and ks, respectively. Each letter is always spoken in the same way, except that final h is silent in a few borrowed words like pashah, muftih, kadih, papah, mamah.

Spelling
All words are written with initial small letters (minuscules), except for proper nouns and the first word of a sentence.

Stress
Words ending in a vowel have a stress accent on the second-last syllable. Words ending in a consonant have a stress accent on the last syllable.

The plural -s or -os does not affect the stress accent.

In the combinations uo, au and eu, the vowels are to be pronounced separately, not as diphthongs. Nevertheless, the stress accent does not fall on the u in these vowel combinations.

Grammar

The articles are invariable:
 lo (the): lo frato, lo soro, lo arbro → l'arbro
 un (a/an): un arbro

Adjectives end in a and are invariable:
 un bona soro, un bona frato, lo bona fratos (no s added to lo, nor to bona)

Adverbs end in e and are invariable:
 bon → bone

Singular nouns end in o, which can be dropped, as long as the pronunciations remain very easy. Plural nouns end in os.
 arbro, frat(o), sor(o), arbros

There is also the pronoun ziel for mixed-sex group.

 Mi vidar te = I see you
 Tu vidar me = You see me

Verbs:
 Present: ar → mi vidar (I see)
 Past: ir → mi vidir (I saw/have seen)
 Future: or → mi vidor (I will see)
 Conditional: ur → mi vidur (I would see)
 Imperative/infinitive: iu or u (the latter for polysyllabic verbs) → vidu! (See!)
 Past participle: at → vidat (adjective: vidata) (seen)
 Present participle: ande → vidande (adjective: vidanda) (seeing)
 Future participle: inde → vidinde (adjective: vidinda) (will be seen)

Samples
The Lord's Prayer

Sentences

Look before you leap. = 
Goodnight, Miss Wilson. = 
What do you call this in Neo? = 
Where are you going? = 
It's none of my business. = 

Numbers

1 , 2 , 3 , 4 , 5 , 6 , 7 , 8 , 9 , 10 
11 , 12 
20 , 21 , ... 30 , 40 
100 , 1000 
5184 
3522 

Wanderer's Nightsong by Johann Wolfgang von Goethe

Wanderer's Nightsong

Up there all summits
are still.
In all the tree-tops
you will
feel but the dew.
The birds in the forest stopped talking.
Soon, done with walking,
you shall rest, too.

The Task by Douglas Blacklock

The Task

Words are used both to inform
And to deceive and ensnare.
God turns mens hearts
From the path of slavery
To that of Freedom.
The unadorned short words of Neo
May become an inspiration
To the rightful use
Of Speech and Writing.

(Gino Buti)

(Arturo Alfandari)

References

Bibliography
Arturo Alfandari, Cours pratique de NEO, Brussel, Éditions Brepols, 1961. (DJVU 23.3 MB)
Arturo Alfandari, Méthode rapide de NEO, Brussel, Éditions Brepols, 1965. (DJVU 4.5 MB)
Arturo Alfandari, Rapid method of NEO, Brussel, Éditions Brepols, 1966. (DJVU 4.7 MB)

External links

Neo - a language conceived by Arturo Alfandari
A blog in and on Neo
A two-page overview
The first 30 pages of The Rapid Method of Neo
Neo Wiki on Miraheze

Constructed languages
International auxiliary languages
Constructed languages introduced in the 1930s
1937 introductions